This is a list of films produced by the Tollywood (Telugu language film industry) based in Hyderabad in the year 2007.

2007

Dubbed films

Notable deaths

References

2007
Telugu
2007 in Indian cinema